Obrad Zelic (Serbian Cyrillic: Oбрад Зелић) is a regular professor of parodontology and oral medicine at the University of Belgrade's Faculty of Stomatology and a guest professor at faculties in Moscow, Yerevan, Toronto, Winnipeg, Athens, and Jerusalem. He was the first to graduate in the class of 1970, and became a docent before his 33rd birthday in 1979.

The BULLETIN OF THE SERBIAN MEDICAL SOCIETY listed him as having been awarded The Serbian Medical Society's Lifetime Achievement Award in 2009 (Награда за животно дело).

He is "President of the Association of Dentists of Serbia" ( је на свечаном отварању председник конгреса и Удружења стоматолога Србије, проф.др Обрад Зелић. ...).

Life
He was born in Obrovac in 1946, in the respectable Dalmatian family of Serbian Orthodox Church dignitary Gerasim Zelic. The Zelic family is closely related with the uskok Duke Stojan Jankovic and writer Vladan Desnica.

Work
So far, Zelic has operated on over 10,000 patients with gingivitis and parodontopathy. He is the founder and head of a school of parodontal medicine and mucogingival microsurgery. He has educated 23 PhDs, 18 masters and more than 80 specialists in this field of stomatology. In the past few years, he has been doing research on the influence of systemic diseases – particularly diabetes – on diseases of the mouth, as well as on the installation of oral implants for toothless patients. Obrad Zelic is considered one of the most important scientists working in stomatology.

Scientific work 
Zelic has published over 200 scientific papers in Serbia and 70 in foreign publications. He has also published 12 monographies and textbooks so far. The Basics of Clinical Parodontology, published in 2002, was the first textbook at the Faculty of Stomatology to be published in e-form, and its most important sections were also translated into English and Russian. Professor Zelic's scientific works were often quoted in leading global and local magazines, monographies and textbooks. Zelic is a member of the offices of scientific magazines, such as the Serbian Stomatological Journal, the Stomatological Bulletin and Oral Implantology. He also reviewed a large number of textbooks, monographies and atlases, and numerous scientific papers. He has been running a school of parodontal and mucogingival microsurgery for 30 years, of which he is the founder. He also participates in many mass media (was a regular associate of the daily Politika), where he has been continuously working on educating citizens about proper dental and gum care.

Academic work 

He was the head of the central laboratory of the Belgrade Faculty of Stomatology between 1983 and 1987. He was the chief of the parodontology and oral medication section at the faculty between 1989 and 1993, after which he was the manager of the Faculty of Stomatology's parodontology and oral medicine clinic between 1993 and 2000.

Research 

He was the chief researcher on 6 scientific projects, and is now:

An associate on the Serbian Ministry of Science and Technology project titled “THE ETIOLOGY, RISK FACTORS AND THERAPY OF DISEASES OF THE PARODONTIUM” no. 1552 
The head of the project dubbed "REGENERATIVE TREATMENT OF PROGRESSIVE PERIODONTITIS USING DIFFERENT ALOPLASTIC MATERIALS," on which he is working together with colleagues from Germany, Canada and the US. 
He was made honorary doctor of sciences at the University of Yerevan's Medical School in 1995.

PhD Obrad Zelic is a major innovator in the introduction of new healing preparations. He is the maker of a patent for the new anti-septic solution for healing the inflammation of the mouth cavity and gullet – Ozosept (1993) and Ozosept-Gel (1999). The Ozosept solution (patent no. P-252/1993, registration no. 48539/1998) has become part of everyday clinical and ambulance practice in our country and most countries of this region.

He headed (1989–2001) the design of and pre-clinical and clinical studies on the production of the first artificial bone made in Serbia (Aldovit-1).

Patents 

Zelic patented the OZOSEPT in 1993, under the number P-252/93 as A SOLUTION FOR MOUTH AND THROAT RINSING. The Federal Intellectual Property Bureau accepted the request for the patent's acknowledging on July 1, 1998, which was published in the Intellectual Property Journal, no. 3/98. The invention was registered in the Patent Register, under the number: 48538. It is produced by the Belgrade-based company Pharmanova.

INVENTION OZOSEPT-GEL – A GEL FOR SOOTHING THE INFLAMMATION OF THE MUCOUS MEMBRANE 
Inventor: Professor PhD Obrad Zelic. The invention was registered in the Patent Register, under the number: 130902. Trial production has been launched (Pharmanova, Belgrade).

INVENTION OZOMET – CONCENTRATED GEL FOR THE TREATMENT OF ULCERONECROTIC PROCESSES 
Inventor: Professor PhD Obrad Zelic. Patenting is in progress.

Awards 

Professor Zelic has won several awards for his achievements in science and innovation, and we would particularly like to point out the Tesla – Pupin gold medal for innovation (no. 006 – 2002). He also won the annual Serbian Medical Society award for scientific and research work in 2003. He is a member of numerous international scientific associations (FDI, IADR, ADI, BSS, etc.). He became an extraordinary member of the Serbian Medical Society's Academy of Medical Sciences in 1998, and a full member in 2006.

Contribution 

Apart from demanding scientific, health care and educational work, Obrad Zelic has also shown great initiative in humanitarian activities. In 1990, he founded the Serbian branch of the Kiwanis club, one of the most important charity organizations in the world, and is also active in other similar associations – in campaigns aimed at helping children, the sick and the people who have experienced the horrors of war. He was the president of the Kiwanis club in Belgrade in 1999 and 2000.

Lectures 

He has given several lectures in Serbia, the former Yugoslav republics and abroad (Russia, Armenia, Greece, Germany, Canada, Hungary, Switzerland, Israel, Mexico).

References

1946 births
Serbs of Croatia
Serbian dentists
Living people
Academic staff of the University of Belgrade